Operation Wet ẹ (English: wet him/her) was a violent protest that took place in Western Nigeria between violent political factions, the Hausa-Fulani natives and some members of the Nigerian National Democratic Party during the First Republic which eventually led to the first military coup in Nigeria on 15 January 1966.

The term "Operation Wet ẹ" was coined from the setting ablaze of politicians and their properties with petrol, with many victims of the political violence killed by "necklacing." During the early 1960s, violence was on a rapid rise in the political system of Nigeria which led to the introduction of Operation Wetie whereby political gangs were used to disrupt elections.

Operation Wet ẹ was significantly used in 1962 when Chief Ladoke Akintola and Chief Obafemi Awolowo were embroiled in a protracted crisis thus leading to a high rate of violence and acts of lawlessness with law makers engaging themselves in vicious physical combats in the Western regional parliament.

Further reading

References

Protests in Nigeria